Jill Sheila Tweedie (22 May 1936 – 12 November 1993) was a British feminist, writer and broadcaster. She was educated at the independent Croydon High School in Croydon, South London. She wrote a column in The Guardian on feminist issues (1969–1988), "Letters from a faint-hearted feminist", and an autobiography entitled Eating Children (1993). She succeeded Mary Stott as a principal columnist on The Guardian's women's page.

Her light style and left-leaning politics captured the spirit of British feminism in the 1970s and 1980s. In November 2005 she was one of only five women included in the Press Gazette's 40-strong gallery of most influential British journalists.

She was married three times, to the Hungarian Count Bela Cziraky, to Bob d'Ancona, and finally to journalist Alan Brien, her partner until her death from motor neurone disease in 1993.

She is commemorated in a group portrait at the National Portrait Gallery with fellow Guardian Women's Page contributors Mary Stott, Polly Toynbee, Posy Simmonds and Liz Forgan.

References

External links
 Jill Tweedie: The Fainthearted Feminist, BBC

1936 births
1993 deaths
British feminists
Neurological disease deaths in England
Deaths from motor neuron disease
The Guardian journalists
People educated at Croydon High School
Women's page journalists
20th-century British journalists